Kukuryak Bluff is the partly ice-free bluff rising to 739 m at the end of a ridge descending eastwards from Louis-Philippe Plateau on Trinity Peninsula in Graham Land, Antarctica.  It is surmounting Cugnot Ice Piedmont to the southeast.

The bluff is named after the settlement of Kukuryak in Southern Bulgaria.

Location

Surmounting Cugnot Ice Piedmont to the southeast and southwest. German-British mapping in 1996.

Maps
 Trinity Peninsula. Scale 1:250000 topographic map No. 5697. Institut für Angewandte Geodäsie and British Antarctic Survey, 1996.
 Antarctic Digital Database (ADD). Scale 1:250000 topographic map of Antarctica. Scientific Committee on Antarctic Research (SCAR). Since 1993, regularly updated.

Notes

References
 Kukuryak Bluff. SCAR Composite Antarctic Gazetteer
 Bulgarian Antarctic Gazetteer. Antarctic Place-names Commission. (details in Bulgarian, basic data in English)

External links
 Kukuryak Bluff. Copernix satellite image

Cliffs of Graham Land
Landforms of Trinity Peninsula
Bulgaria and the Antarctic